The 1944 Maine gubernatorial election took place on September 11, 1944. Incumbent Republican Governor Sumner Sewall, chose -in keeping with tradition- not to seek re-election after two terms.  Republican Maine Senate President Horace Hildreth faced off against Democrat Paul J. Jullien, and defeated him in one of the most lopsided elections in Maine history.

Results

Notes

Maine
1944
Gubernatorial
September 1944 events